Fernanda Maria Botelho (born 1957) is an American mathematician, a professor and the director of graduate studies and coordinator of mathematics at the University of Memphis. Botelho earned her Ph.D. in 1988 at the University of California at Berkeley, where Jenny Harrison was her doctoral advisor. Earlier she did her M.Sc in 1985 and B.Sc in 1981 in mathematics at the Universidade do Porto. Her research interests include functional analysis, operator theory and dynamical systems. From 2013 through 2016, she held the Dunavant Professorship at the University of Memphis.

References 

1957 births
Living people
20th-century American mathematicians
Women mathematicians
University of Memphis faculty
UC Berkeley College of Letters and Science alumni
University of Porto alumni
21st-century American mathematicians